Abu'l-Fath ibn Abi al-Hasan al-Samiri al-Danafi, was a 14th-century Samaritan chronicler. His major work is Kitab al-Ta'rikh. The work was commissioned in 1352 by Pinḥas, Samaritan High Priest, and begun in 1356. It is a compilation of Samaritan history from cited earlier sources, running from Adam to Mohammed. It was edited by Eduard Vilmar as Abulfathi annales Samaritani (Gotha, 1865).

References

Further reading
 Paul Stenhouse, The Kitab al-Tarikh of Abu 'l-Fath (Sydney, Mandelbaum, 1985). Publisher description: "Based on an analysis of all the important MSS and accompanied by copious notes on the Arabic original, this work is the first translation of the whole of this most important of the Samaritan chronicles into English."
 Abu L-Fath Al-Samiri Al-Danafi, Continuatio of the Samaritan Chronicle of Abu L'Fath Al Samiri Al Danafi (Princeton, New Jersey: Darwin Press, 2002) (Studies in Late Antiquity and Early Islam, No. 10). Milka Levy-Rubin (translator).

External links
 Ab al-Fat ibn Ab al-asan, al-Smir, and  Vilmar, Eduardus (1865): Abulfathi Annales Samaritani: quos Arabice edidit cum prolegomenis

14th-century historians of the medieval Islamic world
14th-century Asian people
Islamic Chroniclers
Medieval Samaritan people